2,4-Dinitrophenylmorphine is an analog of morphine in which a hydroxyl group is substituted with a dinitro phenoxy group.

Properties
Being an analog of morphine, it would be expected to have the same effects on the body as a typical opioid. Also, as dinitrophenol is a metabolic and respiratory stimulant, this morphine derivative was invented in Austria in 1931 as a narcotic analgesic with less potential to depress respiration.

References 

Semisynthetic opioids
4,5-Epoxymorphinans
Phenol ethers
Secondary alcohols
Cyclohexenes
Nitrobenzenes